Henry R. Low (September 23, 1826 – December 1, 1888) was an American lawyer, judge and politician from New York.

Early life
On September 23, 1826, Low was born in Fallsburg, New York, U.S. Low's father was John A. Low. Low's mother was Charlotte (Drake) Low (d. 1848).

Education 
He studied law with Archibald C. Niven in Monticello.

Career 
Low was admitted to the bar, and practiced law in partnership with Niven.

Low was a Judge and Surrogate of the Sullivan County Court from 1857 to 1861.

He was a member of the New York State Senate (9th D.) in 1862 and 1863. In November 1863, Low ran for re-election, but his former law partner Niven was declared elected. Low contested Niven's election, and was seated in the State Senate for the 88th Session on January 17, 1865. He was re-elected in 1865, and continued in the Senate in 1866 and 1867. Afterwards he resumed his law practice in Middletown, Orange County, New York.

In 1882, he ran for Congress in the 15th District, but was defeated by Democrat John H. Bagley Jr. Low was again a member of the State Senate (13th D.) from 1884 until his death, sitting in the 107th, 108th, 109th, 110th and 111th New York State Legislatures. He was President pro tempore during his last session.

Personal 
In 1854, he married Mary C. Watkins (d. 1881), daughter of State Senator John D. Watkins, and they had five children.
On December 1, 1888, Low died in New York City, New York (state), of kidney disease. He was 62. Low was buried at the Hillside Cemetery in Middletown, Orange County, New York.

References

 The New York Civil List compiled by Franklin Benjamin Hough, Stephen C. Hutchins and Edgar Albert Werner (1870; pg. 436 and 443f)
 Biographical Sketches of the State Officers and the Members of the Legislature of the State of New York in 1862 and '63 by William D. Murphy (1863; pg. 83ff)

External links

1826 births
1888 deaths
Republican Party New York (state) state senators
People from Middletown, Orange County, New York
People from Fallsburg, New York
New York (state) state court judges
Majority leaders of the New York State Senate
19th-century American politicians
19th-century American judges